The Mountbatten family is a British dynasty that originated as an English branch of the German princely Battenberg family. The name was adopted on 14 July 1917, three days before the British royal family changed its name to “Windsor”, by members of the Battenberg family residing in the United Kingdom, due to rising anti-German sentiment among the British public during World War I. The name is a direct Anglicisation of the German , or Batten mountain, a small town in Hesse. The titles of count and later prince of Battenberg had been granted in the mid-19th century to a morganatic branch of the House of Hesse-Darmstadt, itself a cadet branch of the House of Hesse.

The family includes the Marquesses of Milford Haven (and formerly the Marquesses of Carisbrooke), as well as the Earls Mountbatten of Burma. The late Prince Philip, Duke of Edinburgh, consort of Queen Elizabeth II, adopted the surname of Mountbatten from his mother's family in 1947, being a member of the House of Schleswig-Holstein-Sonderburg-Glücksburg by patrilineal descent. Lady Louise Mountbatten became Queen Consort of Sweden, after having married Gustaf VI Adolf of Sweden.

Origins
The Mountbatten family are a branch of the German house of Battenberg. The Battenberg family was a morganatic branch of the House of Hesse-Darmstadt, rulers of the Grand Duchy of Hesse in Germany. The first member of the House of Battenberg was Julia Hauke, whose brother-in-law Grand Duke Louis III of Hesse created her Countess of Battenberg with the style Illustrious Highness (HIllH) in 1851, on the occasion of her morganatic marriage to Grand Duke Louis' brother Prince Alexander of Hesse and by Rhine. Julia was elevated in her title to Princess of Battenberg with the style Serene Highness (HSH) in 1858.

Two of Alexander and Julia's sons, Prince Henry of Battenberg and Prince Louis of Battenberg, became associated with the British Royal Family. Prince Henry married The Princess Beatrice, the youngest daughter of Queen Victoria. Prince Louis married Victoria's granddaughter, Princess Victoria of Hesse and by Rhine, and became the First Sea Lord of the Royal Navy. Due to anti-German feelings prevalent in Britain during World War I, Prince Louis, his children, and his nephews (the living sons of Prince Henry), renounced their German titles and changed their name to the more English sounding Mountbatten. (They rejected an alternative translation, "Battenhill".) Their cousin George V compensated the princes with British peerages. Prince Louis became the 1st Marquess of Milford Haven, while Prince Alexander, Prince Henry's eldest son, became the 1st Marquess of Carisbrooke.

Members

Marquesses of Milford Haven

The marquessate of Milford Haven was created in 1917 for Prince Louis of Battenberg, the former First Sea Lord, and a relation to the British Royal family. He was at the same time made Earl of Medina and Viscount Alderney, also in the Peerage of the United Kingdom. Princess Alice of Battenberg never took the name Mountbatten as she married Prince Andrew of Greece and Denmark in 1903; her son, Prince Philip of Greece and Denmark, took the name upon becoming a naturalised British citizen.
 Louis Mountbatten, 1st Marquess of Milford Haven (1854–1921) m. Princess Victoria of Hesse and by Rhine
 Princess Alice of Battenberg (1885–1969) m. Prince Andrew of Greece and Denmark, son of King George I of Greece
 Princess Margarita of Greece and Denmark (1905–1981) m. Gottfried, Prince of Hohenlohe-Langenburg
 Princess Theodora of Greece and Denmark (1906–1969) m. Berthold, Margrave of Baden
 Princess Cecilie of Greece and Denmark (1911–1937) m. Georg Donatus, Hereditary Grand Duke of Hesse
 Princess Sophie of Greece and Denmark (1914–2001) m. Prince Christoph of Hesse d. 1943, m. Prince George William of Hanover
 Prince Philip of Greece and Denmark (1921–2021), m. Elizabeth II of the United Kingdom
 Lady Louise Mountbatten (1889–1965) m. Gustaf VI Adolf of Sweden
 George Mountbatten, 2nd Marquess of Milford Haven (1892–1938) m. Countess Nadejda Mikhailovna de Torby
 Lady Tatiana Mountbatten (1917–1988)
 David Mountbatten, 3rd Marquess of Milford Haven (1919–1970) m. Romaine Dahlgren Pierce div. 1954, m. Janet Mercedes Bryce
 George Mountbatten, 4th Marquess of Milford Haven (b. 1961) m. Sarah Georgina Walker div. 1996, m. Clare Steel
 Lady Tatiana Dru (b. 1990) m. Alexander Dru
 Henry Mountbatten, Earl of Medina (b. 1991)
 Lord Ivar Mountbatten (b. 1963) m. Penelope Anne Vere Thompson div. 2011, m. James Coyle
 Ella Mountbatten (b. 1996)
 Alexandra Mountbatten (b. 1998)
 Louise Mountbatten (b. 2002)
 Louis Mountbatten, 1st Earl Mountbatten of Burma (1900–1979) m. Edwina Ashley
 Patricia Knatchbull, 2nd Countess Mountbatten of Burma (1924–2017) m. John Knatchbull, 7th Baron Brabourne
 Lady Pamela Hicks (b. 1929) m. David Nightingale Hicks

The heir apparent to the marquessate is the present holder's son Henry Mountbatten, Earl of Medina (b. 1991)

The 1st Marquess's youngest daughter, Lady Louise Mountbatten, married the crown prince of Sweden in 1923. On his accession in 1950 as Gustaf VI Adolf of Sweden, Louise became Queen consort of Sweden.

Earls Mountbatten of Burma

Earl Mountbatten of Burma is a title in the Peerage of the United Kingdom, created in 1947 for Rear Admiral Louis Mountbatten, 1st Viscount Mountbatten of Burma, youngest son of the 1st Marquess of Milford Haven and the last Viceroy of India. The letters patent creating the title specified the following special remainder to his daughters. The subsidiary titles of the Earldom are Viscount Mountbatten of Burma, of Romsey in the County of Southampton, created 1946, and Baron Romsey, of Romsey in the County of Southampton, created in 1947. Both of these titles, in the Peerage of the United Kingdom, have the same special remainder as the Earldom.
 Louis Mountbatten, 1st Earl Mountbatten of Burma (1900–1979) m. Edwina Cynthia Annette Ashley, daughter of Wilfrid Ashley, 1st Baron Mount Temple and great-granddaughter of Anthony Ashley-Cooper, 7th Earl of Shaftesbury
 Patricia Knatchbull, 2nd Countess Mountbatten of Burma (1924–2017) m. John Knatchbull, 7th Baron Brabourne
 Norton Knatchbull, 3rd Earl Mountbatten of Burma (b. 1947) m. Penelope Eastwood
 Nicholas Knatchbull, Lord Brabourne (b. 1981)
 Lady Alexandra Hooper (b. 1982) m. Thomas Hooper
 The Hon. Leonora Knatchbull (1986–1991)
 The Hon. Michael-John Knatchbull (b. 1950) m. Melissa Clare Owen, div. 1997, m. Susan Penelope "Penny" Jane Coates, div. 2006
 Kelly Knatchbull (b. 1988)
 Savannah Knatchbull (b. 2001)
 The Hon. Anthony Knatchbull (1952–1952)
 Lady Joanna Zuckerman (b. 1955) m. Baron Hubert Pernot du Breuil, div. 1995, m. Azriel Zuckerman
 Lady Amanda Ellingworth (b. 1957) m. Charles Vincent Ellingworth
 The Hon. Philip Knatchbull (b. 1961) m. Atalanta Cowan, div., m. Wendy Amanda Leach
 Daisy Knatchbull (b. 1992)
 Frederick Knatchbull (b. 2003)
 John Knatchbull (b. 2004)
 The Hon. Nicholas Knatchbull (1964–1979)
 The Hon. Timothy Knatchbull (b. 1964) m. Isabella Julia Norman
 Amber Knatchbull (b. 2000)
 Milo Knatchbull (b. 2001)
 Ludovic Knatchbull (b. 2003)
 Isla Knatchbull (b. 2005)
 Wilhelmina Knatchbull (b. 2008)
 Lady Pamela Hicks (b. 1929) m. David Nightingale Hicks
 Edwina Brudenell (b. 1961) m. Jeremy Brudenell, div. 2004
 Ashley Hicks (b. 1963) m. Marina Allegra Federica Silvia Tondato, div. 2009, m. Katalina Sharkey de Solis
 Angelica Hicks (b. 1992)
 Ambrosia Hicks (b. 1997)
 Caspian Hicks (b. 2018)
 Horatio Hicks (b. 2019)
 India Hicks (b. 1967)

The heir apparent to the earldom is the present holder's son, Nicholas Knatchbull, Lord Brabourne (born 1981).

Marquess of Carisbrooke

Marquess of Carisbrooke was a title in the Peerage of the United Kingdom, created in 1917 for Prince Alexander of Battenberg, eldest son of Princess Beatrice of the United Kingdom and Prince Henry of Battenberg. He was made Viscount Launceston, in the County of Cornwall, and Earl of Berkhampsted at the same time, also in the Peerage of the United Kingdom. The titles became extinct upon Lord Carisbrooke's death in 1960, as he had no sons.
 Alexander Mountbatten, 1st Marquess of Carisbrooke (1886–1960) m. Lady Irene Denison, daughter of William Denison, 2nd Earl of Londesborough
 Lady Iris Mountbatten (1920–1982) m. Captain Hamilton Joseph Keyes O'Malley, div. 1946, m. Michael Neely Bryan, div. 1957, m. William Alexander Kemp

His siblings were:
 Princess Victoria Eugenie of Battenberg (1887–1969), m. Alfonso XIII of Spain
 Lord Leopold Mountbatten (1889–1922)
 Prince Maurice of Battenberg (1891–1914)

Prince Philip, Duke of Edinburgh

Prince Philip, Duke of Edinburgh, the son of Princess Alice of Battenberg and grandson of the 1st Marquess of Milford Haven, took the name Mountbatten when he became a naturalised British subject. Lieutenant Philip Mountbatten married Princess Elizabeth, daughter of King George VI of the United Kingdom, on 20 November 1947. In 1952, on the accession of his wife as Queen Elizabeth II, there was some dispute regarding the dynasty to which descendants of Elizabeth and Phillip would belong. Queen Mary (the new Queen's grandmother) expressed to Prime Minister Winston Churchill her aversion to the idea of the House of Mountbatten succeeding the House of Windsor as the royal dynasty. Winston Churchill raised the matter in Parliament where it was decided that the name of the Royal House would remain Windsor, as decreed in perpetuity by Queen Mary's husband, King George V.
 Prince Philip, Duke of Edinburgh (1921–2021) m. Queen Elizabeth II of the United Kingdom
 King Charles III (b. 1948) m. Lady Diana Spencer, div. 1996, m. Camilla Parker Bowles
 William, Prince of Wales (b. 1982) m. Catherine Middleton
 Prince George of Wales (b. 2013)
 Princess Charlotte of Wales (b. 2015)
 Prince Louis of Wales (b. 2018)
 Prince Harry, Duke of Sussex (b. 1984) m. Meghan Markle
 Prince Archie of Sussex (b. 2019)
 Princess Lilibet of Sussex (b. 2021)
 Anne, Princess Royal (b. 1950) m. Captain Mark Phillips, div. 1992, m. Vice Admiral Sir Timothy Laurence
 Prince Andrew, Duke of York (b. 1960) m. Sarah Ferguson, div. 1996
 Princess Beatrice of York (b. 1988) m. Edoardo Mapelli Mozzi
 Princess Eugenie of York (b. 1990) m. Jack Brooksbank
 Prince Edward, Duke of Edinburgh (b. 1964) m. Sophie Rhys-Jones
 Lady Louise Mountbatten-Windsor (b. 2003)
 James, Earl of Wessex (b. 2007)

Mountbatten-Windsor

Mountbatten-Windsor is the personal surname of some of the descendants of Queen Elizabeth II and Prince Philip, Duke of Edinburgh under an Order in Council issued in 1960, which has not been applied consistently.  While the Order specifically applies the surname "Mountbatten-Windsor" to Elizabeth's male-line descendants not holding Royal styles and titles, "Mountbatten-Windsor" has been formally used by some of her descendants who do hold Royal styles. The surname was first officially used by Princess Anne in 1973, in the wedding register for her marriage to Mark Phillips. Prince William and his wife Catherine used the names "Monsieur et Madame Mountbatten-Windsor" when filing a French lawsuit against the French magazine Closer. Prince Harry, Duke of Sussex and his wife Meghan named their children Archie Mountbatten-Windsor and Lilibet Mountbatten-Windsor from birth, although the children formally became a prince and princess on the accession of their grandfather to the throne on 8 September 2022.

Mountbatten-Windsor differs from the official name of the British royal family or royal house, which remains Windsor. The adoption of the Mountbatten-Windsor surname applies only to members of the royal family who are descended from Elizabeth, and not, for example, to her cousins, or descendants of her sister, Princess Margaret.

Legacy
The city of Ottawa, Ontario, erected Mountbatten Avenue in memory of the 1st Earl Mountbatten of Burma. A Royal Canadian Sea Cadets corps, RCSCC No. 134 Admiral Mountbatten, was named after him in 1946. A  bronze statue by Franta Belsky of Lord Mountbatten of Burma was erected in 1983 outside the Foreign Office, overlooking Horse Guards Parade. The earl is dressed in the uniform of an Admiral of the Fleet.

The Mountbatten Institute (formerly known as the Mountbatten Internship Programme), an organization based in New York and London dedicated to fostering work experience and cultural exchange by placing international graduate students abroad to earn postgraduate and degrees was set up by his eldest daughter, Patricia, 2nd Countess Mountbatten. It was named in honour of the countess's father, the 1st Earl Mountbatten of Burma.

Despite the family's well-known connections with the Royal Navy, the Mount Batten Peninsula, overlooking the Royal Naval Base of Devonport, England, is not named after them but after Sir William Batten, a 17th-century Surveyor of the Navy.

Coats of arms

Family tree

See also
 Battenberg family
 Mountbatten-Windsor
 Mountbatten class hovercraft
 Mountbatten Medal
 The Mountbatten School And Language College
 Mountbatten Institute
 Edward Iwi

References

External links

Tribute & Memorial Website to Louis, 1st Earl Mountbatten of Burma

 
Battenberg family
Mountbatten-Windsor family
Mountbatten
British monarchy